The supraspinatus (plural supraspinati) is a relatively small muscle of the upper back that runs from the supraspinous fossa superior portion of the scapula (shoulder blade) to the greater tubercle of the humerus. It is one of the four rotator cuff muscles and also abducts the arm at the shoulder. The spine of the scapula separates the supraspinatus muscle from the infraspinatus muscle, which originates below the spine.

Structure
The supraspinatus muscle arises from the supraspinous fossa, a shallow depression in the body of the scapula above its spine. The supraspinatus muscle tendon passes laterally beneath the cover of the acromion. Research in 1996 showed that the postero-lateral origin was more lateral than classically described.

The supraspinatus tendon is inserted into the superior facet of the greater tubercle of the humerus. The distal attachments of the three rotator cuff muscles that insert into the greater tubercle of the humerus can be abbreviated as SIT when viewed from superior to inferior (for supraspinatus, infraspinatus, and teres minor), or SITS when the subscapularis muscle, which attaches to the lesser tubercle of the humerus, is included.

Nerve supply
The suprascapular nerve (C5) innervates the supraspinatus muscle as well as the infraspinatus muscle. It comes from the upper trunk of the brachial plexus. 
This nerve can be damaged along its course in fractures of the overlying clavicle, which can reduce the person's ability to initiate the abduction.

Function
The supraspinatus muscle performs abduction of the arm, and pulls the head of the humerus medially towards the glenoid cavity. It independently prevents the head of the humerus from slipping inferiorly. The supraspinatus works in cooperation with the deltoid muscle to perform abduction, including when the arm is in an adducted position. Beyond 15 degrees the deltoid muscle becomes increasingly more effective at abducting the arm and becomes the main propagator of this action.

Clinical significance
The supraspinatus forms part of the rotator cuff and is one of its most frequently damaged components, whether from acute injury or gradual degeneration. Bad posture and age are leading risk factors, with a high prevalence of unsymptomatic partial and full tears, as well as symptomatic syndromes with chronic pain. Connected pathologies include acromial impingement, frozen shoulder, and poor sleep, especially on the side. Both ultrasound and MRI are now effective methods of diagnosis.

Tear
Diagnosis
Antero-posterior projectional radiography of the shoulder may demonstrate a high-riding humeral head, with an acromiohumeral distance of less than 7 mm.
Repair
One study has indicated that arthroscopic surgery for full-thickness supraspinatus tears is effective for improving shoulder functionality.

A comparative effectiveness review  of nonoperative and operative treatments for rotator cuff tears was performed at the University of Alberta Evidence-based Practice Center in 2010. The review identified one study which reported that, "Patients receiving early surgery had superior function compared with the delayed surgical group". The review noted that the level of significance of the study was not reported, and the review chose not to include it as one of their conclusions. Instead it concluded that "The paucity of evidence related to early versus delayed surgery is of particular concern, as patients and providers must decide whether to attempt initial nonoperative management or proceed immediately with surgical repair".  In terms of operative techniques, differences in neither cuff integrity nor shoulder function were reported in studies comparing single-row versus double-row suture anchor fixation and mattress locking versus absorbable sutures. Postoperatively, a slight advantage was evident in patients who performed continuous passive motion alongside physical therapy, as opposed to those who solely performed physical therapy. There is insufficient evidence to adequately compare the effects of operative against nonoperative interventions. Complications were reported very seldom, or were not determined to be clinically significant.

A 2016 study evaluating the effectiveness of arthroscopic treatment of rotator cuff calcification firmly supported surgical intervention. Calcification of the supraspinatus tendon is a major contributor to shoulder pain in the general population and is often worsened following a supraspinatus tear. The results of the study included the return to sports and original functionality of 95.8% of the patients after a mean of 5.3 post-operative months. A significant decrease in pain was observed over time following removal of the calcification. The study showed the overall effectiveness of arthroscopic procedures on shoulder repair, and the lack of risk experienced. Before surgery, supraspinatus tendonitis should be ruled out as the cause of pain.

Gallery

References

Muscles of the upper limb
Rotator cuff
Shoulder abductors